Hans Wehrmann (born 9 May 1964 in Hanover) is a German entrepreneur, economist, inventor and author of literature in scientific management.

Studies and Business Career 
Wehrmann started his career during his schooldays as an independent entrepreneur by dealing in used refrigerators, stoves, and washing machines. He studied economy in German and French at Fribourg University in Switzerland, achieving a Dr. rer. pol. Additionally he held a Master of Business Administration (MBA) of the university INSEAD in Fontainebleau, France. He covered the costs for his studies in Switzerland and for the MBA program by founding a publishing house as well as organizing management and recruiting seminars.

He worked for Boston Consulting Group in Germany, afterwards founding the Certina Holding AG and growing it into an international conglomerate.

Furthermore, he is boardmember of L'Osteria.

Scientific Career and Inventions
As a scientist he works on the integration of systems and evolutionary theory into economic science and the dynamics of organizational development and strategic alliances.

Furthermore, he developed multilayer papers containing wastepaper and grass fibers and holds the respective patents in the US and Europe together with German paper-mill Papierfabrik Meldorf

Racing career 
As a racing driver he is participating in different racing series. Among others he won the SP7-Class of the ADAC Nürburgring 24 Hours subsequently in 2020 and 2021.
In 2022, Wehrmann had his Nürburgring Nordschleife permit revoked in response to a speeding offense during the Nürburgring 24 Hours.

Personal life 
Wehrmann is married to Vanessa Wehrmann and divorced from German actress Giulia Siegel.

Academic Works (Extract) 
 System- und Evolutionstheoretische Betrachtungen der Organisationsentwicklung, 1995, Frankfurt am Main
 Management im Wandel. Freiburger Gespräche 1987/1988, hrsg. von Norbert Thom, Hamburg u. a. 1989

References 

1964 births
Living people
Businesspeople from Hanover
Racing drivers from Lower Saxony
Nürburgring 24 Hours drivers
24H Series drivers